In the renormalization group analysis of phase transitions in physics, a critical dimension is the dimensionality of space at which the character of the phase transition changes. Below the lower critical dimension there is no phase transition. Above the upper critical dimension the critical exponents of the theory become the same as that in mean field theory. An elegant criterion to obtain the critical dimension within mean field theory is due to V. Ginzburg.

Since the renormalization group sets up a relation between a phase transition and a quantum field theory, this has implications for the latter and for our larger understanding of renormalization in general. Above the upper critical dimension, the quantum field theory which belongs to the model of the phase transition is a free field theory. Below the lower critical dimension, there is no field theory corresponding to the model.

In the context of string theory the meaning is more restricted: the critical dimension is the dimension at which string theory is consistent assuming a constant dilaton background without additional confounding permutations from background radiation effects. The precise number may be determined by the required cancellation of conformal anomaly on the worldsheet; it is 26 for the bosonic string theory and 10 for superstring theory.

Upper critical dimension in field theory
Determining the upper critical dimension of a field theory is a matter of linear algebra. It is worthwhile to formalize the procedure because it yields the lowest-order approximation for scaling and essential input for the renormalization group. It also reveals conditions to have a critical model in the first place.

A Lagrangian may be written as a sum of terms, each consisting of an integral over a monomial of coordinates  and fields . Examples are the standard -model and the isotropic Lifshitz tricritical point with Lagrangians

see also the figure on the right.
This simple structure may be compatible with a scale invariance under a rescaling of the
coordinates and fields with a factor  according to

The goal is to determine the exponent set .

One exponent, say , may be chosen arbitrarily, for example . In the language of dimensional analysis this means that the exponents  count wave vector factors (a reciprocal length ). Each monomial of the Lagrangian thus leads to a homogeneous linear equation  for the exponents . If this matrix were invertible then there only would be the trivial solution .

The condition  for a nontrivial solution gives an equation between the space dimensions, and this determines the upper critical dimension  (provided there is only one variable dimension  in the Lagrangian). A redefinition of the coordinates and fields now shows that determining the scaling exponents  is equivalent to a dimensional analysis with respect to the wavevector , with all coupling constants occurring in the Lagrangian rendered dimensionless. Dimensionless coupling constants are the technical hallmark for the upper critical dimension.

Naive scaling at the level of the Lagrangian does not directly correspond to physical scaling because a cutoff is required to give a meaning to the field theory and the path integral. Changing the length scale also changes the number of degrees of freedom.
This complication is taken into account by the renormalization group. The main result at the upper critical dimension is that scale invariance remains valid for large factors , but with additional  factors in the scaling of the coordinates and fields.

What happens below or above  depends on whether one is interested in long distances (statistical field theory) or short distances (quantum field theory). Quantum field theories are trivial (convergent) below  and not renormalizable above . Statistical field theories are trivial (convergent) above  and renormalizable below . In the latter case there arise "anomalous" contributions to the naive scaling exponents . These anomalous contributions to the effective critical exponents vanish at the upper critical dimension.

It is instructive to see how the scale invariance at the upper critical dimension becomes a scale invariance below this dimension. For small external wave vectors the vertex functions  acquire additional exponents, for example . If these exponents are inserted into a matrix  (which only has values in the first column) the condition for scale invariance becomes . This equation only can be satisfied if the anomalous exponents of the vertex functions cooperate in some way. In fact, the vertex functions depend on each other hierarchically. One way to express this interdependence are the Dyson–Schwinger equations.

Naive scaling at  thus is important as zeroth order approximation. Naive scaling at the upper critical dimension also classifies terms of the Lagrangian as relevant, irrelevant or marginal. A Lagrangian is compatible with scaling if the - and  -exponents  lie on a hyperplane, for examples see the figure above.  is a normal vector of this hyperplane.

Lower critical dimension

Thermodynamic stability of an ordered phase depends on entropy and energy. Quantitatively this depends on the type of domain walls and their fluctuation modes. There appears to be no generic formal way for deriving the lower critical dimension of a field theory. Lower bounds may be derived with statistical mechanics arguments.

Consider first a one-dimensional system with short range interactions. Creating a domain wall requires a fixed energy amount . This entropy change must be compared with the entropy of the domain wall itself. In a system of length  there are  positions for the domain wall, leading (according to Boltzmann's principle) to an entropy gain . Space dimension  thus is a lower bound for the lower critical dimension of such systems.

A stronger lower bound  can be derived with the help of similar arguments for systems with short range interactions and an order parameter with a continuous symmetry.

For systems with quenched disorder a criterion given by Imry and Ma might be relevant. These authors used the criterion to determine the lower critical dimension of random field magnets.

References

External links
 Kanon: A free windows program to determine the critical dimension, with examples, online help and mathematical details

Critical phenomena
Statistical mechanics
Phase transitions
String theory